The Bonneville flood was a catastrophic flooding event in the last ice age, which involved massive amounts of water inundating parts of southern Idaho and eastern Washington along the course of the Snake River. Unlike the Missoula Floods, which also occurred during the same period in the Pacific Northwest, the Bonneville flood only happened once. The flood is believed to be the second largest in known geologic history.

Cause and events

About 14,500 years ago (radiocarbon dating, 17,400 years ago calendar, "calibrated" dating), pluvial Lake Bonneville in northern Utah reached its highest water level since its formation. As it rose the lake level caused seepage at, then breached, the ancient level of Red Rock Pass, a mountain pass at the headwaters of the Portneuf River, a tributary of the Snake River above present-day American Falls Reservoir. Ancient Red Rock Pass was the site of two alluvial fans descending from opposite sides of the notch, forming a natural dam. When the dam collapsed, it released a  flood crest down the Portneuf River valley, also spilling into the neighboring Bear River valley. When it reached the Snake River, it eroded away a lava dam that had been at the site of the present-day American Falls, releasing a  lake, American Falls Lake, that had formed behind the natural dam.

The flood scoured the  Snake River Canyon through the underlying basalt and loess soil, creating Shoshone Falls and several other waterfalls along the Snake River. It also carved and increased in size many other tributary canyons, including those of the Bruneau River and Salmon Falls Creek. The flood then entered Hells Canyon, significantly widening the gorge. Its waters eventually reached the Pacific Ocean via the Columbia River.

A 2020 theory presented evidence that Lake Bonneville achieved a stable outflow for possibly a thousand years leading up to the Bonneville Flood and then a massive, multi-segment earthquake on the Wasatch Fault caused surging and tsunami in Lake Bonneville with a surge wave over 140' (~42m) high.   This surge carried up into the Cache Valley and resulted in the failure of the natural dam at the Zenda threshold just north of Red Rock Pass.

Legacy
Although the peak of the flood lasted a few weeks at most, erosion at Red Rock Pass continued for a few years before water ceased to spill over. The flood transformed the Snake River Plain into a series of channeled scablands resembling the Columbia Plateau. Also left by the flood were the many "melon" boulders distributed throughout the canyons in the Snake River Plain. According to some geologists, the total volume of the Bonneville flood was actually greater than any individual one of the Missoula Floods, although the Missoula floods released more water as a whole, and at least one had a much higher peak flow rate.

Much of the sediment scoured by the flood was deposited near the mouth of the Snake River. It now lies beneath about 20 layers of Missoula Floods deposits.

See also
Outburst flood
Altai flood

References

Floods in the United States
Snake River
Megafloods
Pleistocene events
Pleistocene United States
Quaternary Idaho
Quaternary Utah